Elisabeth Adele Allram-Lechner (1824-1861) was a stage actor. She was engaged at the Estates Theatre in Prague from 1846 to 1861, where she belonged to the theatre's star attractions. She was known for her heroine roles.

References

 http://de.encyklopedie.idu.cz/index.php/Allram-Lechner_Elisabeth_Adele

19th-century Czech actors
1824 births
1861 deaths